The Kuusinen Club Incident was the murder of eight members of the Finnish Communist Party in the Kuusinen Club (their Saint Petersburg office), on 31 August 1920.

Background
After the ending of the Finnish Civil War in 1918, thousands of Red Guards fled to Russia, mostly to Saint Petersburg. The leaders of the Guard lived lavishly, spending their time in the best hotels and restaurants of Saint Petersburg. They had millions of Finnish marks' worth of foreign exchange that they had stolen from the Bank of Finland.

Many other Finnish Communists who had fled to Soviet Russia were living in very poor conditions, and those who openly criticized party leaders were discharged from the party.

The party began to schism into so-called "revolver oppositions", whose target was to remove the gap between the leaders and the supporters by open violence.

Deaths
 Tuomas W. Hyrskymurto, party staff
 Väinö E. Jokinen, former MP and member of the Finnish Communist Party's central committee
 Ferdinand T. Kettunen, Finnish Communist Party's military organization's steward
 Konsta Lindqvist, former MP and People's Committee's member and transportation delegate
 Jukka Rahja (alias Ivan Abramovitsh Rahja), member of the Finnish Communist Party's central committee
 Jussi Sainio, representative of the Revolutionary Communist Party
 Liisa Savolainen, clerk of military organization
 Juho Viitasaari, Red commander

Shooters
The shooters were six students of the red officer academy, led by Aku Paasi (former August Pyy) and Allan Hägglund.

The shooters wrote letters describing their motives, and then surrendered voluntarily to militia. In 1922, they were convicted; Voitto Eloranta, who was not even present at the shooting scene, was sentenced to death as the organizer, and the others were sentenced to three to five years in prison in Buryatia. Eventually, the death sentence of Eloranta was commuted, and by July 1922, all the shooters were released from jail. Eloranta, however, was executed in 1923 after Eino Rahja lobbied the reconsideration of the commutations. Eloranta's wife Elvira Willman was executed in April 1925.

Memorial
The victims were buried at the Monument to the Fighters of the Revolution on the Field of Mars. An estimated 100,000 people attended the funeral. A memorial service took part in Hermitage on 20 September 1920.

The memorial plaque says that the victims were "Murdered by White Finnish Guards", although the killers had actually been former Red Guard members.

References

Finnish people murdered abroad
Finnish Civil War
August 1920 events
1920 murders in Europe